Off the Charts is the second full album by The Briefs, released in the US and the UK in 2003 on CD, and gatefold and white vinyl. The song "(Looking Through) Gary Glitter's Eyes" is a nod to a song by The Adverts entitled "Gary Gilmore's Eyes".

Track listing
Outer Space (Doesn't Care About You) 
(Looking Through) Gary Glitters Eyes 
Ain't It the Truth 
Piss On the Youth 
Tear It in Two 
We Americans
Who Made You So Smart? 
22nd Century Man 
Ouch Ouch Ouch
Ludlow St. 
Soozy

(UK Version)
(Like A) Heart Attack
She's Abrasive 
Love And Ulcers

2003 albums
Albums produced by Martin Feveyear
The Briefs albums
BYO Records albums